Flour corn (Zea mays var. amylacea) is a variety of corn with a soft starchy endosperm and a thin pericarp. It is primarily used to make corn flour.
This type, frequently found in Aztec and Inca graves, is widely grown in the drier parts of the United States, western South America and South Africa. The large-seeded corns of Peru are used in the preparation of chicha. In South Africa they are known as bread mealies.

The six major types of corn are dent corn, flint corn, pod corn, popcorn, flour corn, and sweet corn.

References

Maize varieties